The canton of Bavella is an administrative division of the Corse-du-Sud department, southeastern France. It was created at the French canton reorganisation which came into effect in March 2015. Its seat is in Porto-Vecchio.

It consists of the following communes:
Conca 
Lecci 
Porto-Vecchio (partly)
San-Gavino-di-Carbini 
Sari-Solenzara 
Zonza

References

Cantons of Corse-du-Sud